Buccochromis spectabilis is a species of haplochromine cichlid. It is endemic to Lake Malawi in Malawi, Mozambique, and Tanzania. It lives in shallow waters near the lake shore.

References

spectablis
Taxa named by Ethelwynn Trewavas
Fish described in 1935
Taxonomy articles created by Polbot